Jean Jacques Smoothie is a British disc jockey, born in Gloucester as Steve Robson.

Biography
He has been DJing since 1994, beginning his DJing in the back bar of a nightclub titled "the Cheesey Club".

He became a surprise one-hit wonder in later 2001 for the song "2 People" (with two different music videos), sampled from "Inside My Love" by Minnie Riperton, in the UK.

In 1997, he founded the record label Plastic Raygun, on which he released his first single, "The Magnificent", under the name Brinkley Paste. Robson remarked "Don't ask me why I used that name. Basically it was badly produced big beat, but it sold 1,500 copies". His follow-up single, "Night Time", "combined disco with the funkier end of house". At this time, the Jean Jacques Smoothie stage name was first used, as Robson later remarked "So I decided to come up with a cheeky French name, and Jean Jacques Smoothie was born!".

Jean Jacques Smoothie also released a single in 2002 entitled "Love & Evil". There was also an "Acoustic Mix" of this single, which features on V2 Music's Acoustic 02 compilation album.

His biggest hit "2 People" was also remixed by Moloko as well as Mirwais.

Discography

Singles

Remixes
2001, "Mirwais Extended Mix" (of "2 People")
2001, "Moloko's Maxique Mix" (of "2 People")
2001, "Louis La Roche Mix" (of "2 People")
2002, "Acoustic Mix" (of "Love & Evil")

References

British dance musicians
British DJs
Living people
Year of birth missing (living people)